Valentin Fedorovich Khokhryakov (Russian: Валентин Федорович Хохряков, born 22 June 1928, Kuybyshev) is a Soviet and Russian scientist, internal dosimetry specialist, PhD in biology (1966), doctor of biology (1986), Professor (2006), awarded the USSR State Prize (1983), adjunct professor of the University of Utah (USA). He is the author and coauthor of more than 170 research papers.

Career and research 

In 1950, he graduated from Physics faculty of Leningrad State University. He was sent to Mayak PA where he had worked as an engineer and senior engineer (1951-1953). At age 25 (1953) he became a faculty member in the "Evening Department #1" of Moscow Engineering Physics Institute (Ozersk Branch of Moscow Engineering Physics Institute), was one of the founders of the Department of General Physics, at the same time lecturing on dosimetry, general and theoretical physics.

Following invitation of  he had started dosimetry and radiobiology scientific study as the Chairman of the Medical Sanitary Unit #71 Biophysics Laboratory (1957). 

Valentin Khokhryakov obtained his PhD degree in March 1966.

Valentin Khokhryakov had created the laboratory in a short time, participated in the development and creation of a hardware and methodological complex for measuring fission fragments and actinides in the human body in the Experimental Department and in Clinic of professional radiation pathology. During his work, he has developed the basic principles and outlined ways to solve many problems of internal dosimetry. He has created and developed a dosimetric control system for personnel of the entire nuclear industry. He has developed a computational model based on an original system for estimating the solubility of aerosols of transuranic nuclides.
 
In his doctoral thesis, he has explored modelling biokinetic plutonium processes in human body (1986). 

For many years he was a member of the editorial board of “Emergency medicine” (Russian: "Медицина катастроф"), now he is a member of the editorial board of "Radiation Safety Issues" (Russian: "Вопросы радиационной безопасности").

5 PhD theses were generated under the guidance of Valentin Fedorovich.

Awards and honours 
Valentin Khokhryakov has received many honors, including a USSR State Prize (1983), medals "For Labour Valour", "Veteran of Labour", II Degree Medal of the Order "For Merit to the Fatherland" (1997), the badge "Excellent worker in healthcare", the badge "Veteran of nuclear energy and industry" (1997).

Personal life 
He lives in Ozersk, Chelyabinsk oblast, Russia.

Publications 
His h-index in the International bibliographic and reference database Scopus reaches 23. Some of the most cited publications:

1990s

2000s

2010s

References 

1928 births
Living people
Scientists from Samara, Russia
Recipients of the Medal of the Order "For Merit to the Fatherland" II class
Recipients of the USSR State Prize
Radiobiologists
Saint Petersburg State University alumni